The Stephen F. Austin Lumberjacks basketball team is the men's basketball team that represents Stephen F. Austin State University (popularly abbreviated as SFA) in Nacogdoches, Texas, United States. (All SFA women's teams are known as Ladyjacks.)

History

In the 2013–2014 season the men's basketball team had its most successful year in more than 2 decades going 32–3 in the regular season and 18–0 in conference play. They won 29 games in a row including the conference semi-final and finals and the second round of the NCAA Tournament. SFA repeated the same feat in their 2015–2016 season by going 18–0 in conference and reaching the second round of the NCAA once again.

On May 20, 2020, following the discovery of an administrative error in certifying eligibility for student-athletes, Stephen F. Austin reached an agreement with the NCAA to vacate hundreds of wins across multiple sports from 2013 to 2019, including all 117 men's basketball wins from the 2014–15 to 2018–19 seasons. As a result, three NCAA tournament appearances and three Southland conference titles were nullified.

SFA is one of four schools, all from Texas, that left the Southland Conference on July 1, 2021 to join the Western Athletic Conference (WAC). SFA had previously played in the Southland Conference since the 1987–88 season.

Postseason appearances

NCAA tournament results
The Lumberjacks have appeared in five NCAA Tournaments. Their combined record is 2–5; however, as a result of their three vacated appearances, they have an "official" record of 1–2.

NIT results
The Lumberjacks have appeared in three National Invitation Tournaments (NIT). Their combined record is 1–3.

CBI results
The Lumberjacks have appeared in the College Basketball Invitational (CBI) once. Their record is 0–1.

CIT results
The Lumberjacks have appeared in one CollegeInsider.com Postseason Tournament (CIT). Their record is 0–1.

Lumberjacks in the NBA
3 former Stephen F. Austin players have played at least one game in the NBA.

References

External links